Andy Murad is an American mixed martial artist currently competing in the Welterweight division of Bellator MMA. A professional competitor since 2003, he has also formerly competed for King of the Cage.

Background
Born in Detroit, Michigan, Murad moved to San Diego County, California at a young age. Murad competing in high school wrestling before picking up Brazilian jiu-jitsu under the tutelage of Dean Lister. Murad then began competing in Muay Thai before making the transition to mixed martial arts.

Mixed martial arts career

Early career
Murad made his professional debut with King of the Cage in the summer of 2003, winning via first-round TKO. He then compiled a record of 6-0 before being signed by Bellator.

Bellator MMA
Murad made his promotional debut at Bellator 99 against Gavin Sterritt on September 13, 2013 in a Catchweight bout of 173 lbs. Murad was handed his first professional defeat via split decision.

Murad then faced Ricky Rainey in a Catchweight of 180 lbs. at Bellator 116 on April 16, 2014. He lost via first-round TKO.

After taking winning his next two fights outside of the promotion and capturing the Gladiator Challenge Middleweight Championship, Murad made his Bellator return at Bellator 131 against Bubba Pugh on November 15, 2014. He won via split decision.

Murad won his next four fights (three submission and one TKO) before returning at Bellator 160 on August 26, 2016 against Johnny Cisneros in a Catchweight of 175 lbs. He won via unanimous decision.

Mixed martial arts record

|-
|Loss
|align=center| 16-3
|Ed Ruth
|TKO (punches)
|Bellator 201
|
|align=center|2
|align=center|4:59
|Temecula, California, United States
| 
|-
| Win
| align=center| 16-2
| Idrees Wasi
| Submission (choke)
| Gladiator Challenge: Fight Fest
| 
| align=center| 1
| align=center| 2:28
| El Cajon, California, United States
|Middleweight bout.
|-
| Win
| align=center| 15-2
| Johnny Cisneros
| Decision (unanimous)
| Bellator 160
| 
| align=center| 3
| align=center| 5:00
| Anaheim, California, United States
|Catchweight (175 lbs) bout.
|-
| Win
| align=center| 14-2
| Jamiah Williamson
| Submission (keylock)
| Gladiator Challenge: Freedom Strikes
| 
| align=center| 2
| align=center| 1:14
| El Cajon, California, United States
| 
|-
| Win
| align=center| 13-2
| Chad Herrick
| Decision (unanimous)
| KOP 49
| 
| align=center| 3
| align=center| 5:00
| Grand Rapids, Michigan, United States
|Return to Light Heavyweight.
|-
| Win
| align=center| 12-2
| Marquise Spears
| Submission (front choke)
| Gladiator Challenge: MMA Smackdown
| 
| align=center| 2
| align=center| 2:12
| El Cajon, California, United States
| 
|-
| Win
| align=center| 11-2
| Matt McOmie
| TKO (punches)
| Gladiator Challenge: Champions
| 
| align=center| 1
| align=center| 1:21
| El Cajon, California, United States
| 
|-
| Win
| align=center| 10-2
| Roman Bellow
| Submission (triangle choke)
| Gladiator Challenge: Warrior's
| 
| align=center| 1
| align=center| 0:36
| El Cajon, California, United States
| 
|-
| Win
| align=center| 9-2
| Bubba Pugh
| Decision (split)
| Bellator 131
| 
| align=center| 3
| align=center| 5:00
| San Diego, California, United States
| 
|-
| Win
| align=center| 8-2
| Brandon Collins
| Decision (unanimous)
| Gladiator Challenge: Battle Ready
| 
| align=center| 3
| align=center| 5:00
| El Cajon, California, United States
|Won Gladiator Challenge Middleweight Championship.
|-
| Win
| align=center| 7-2
| Daniel McWilliams
| TKO (punches)
| Gladiator Challenge: Backlash
| 
| align=center| 3
| align=center| 2:47
| El Cajon, California, United States
| 
|-
| Loss
| align=center| 6-2
| Ricky Rainey
| TKO (punches)
| Bellator CXVI
| 
| align=center| 1
| align=center| 1:11
| Temecula, California, United States
|Catchweight (180 lbs) bout.
|-
| Loss
| align=center| 6-1
| Gavin Sterritt
| Decision (split)
| Bellator XCIX
| 
| align=center| 3
| align=center| 5:00
| Temecula, California, United States		
|Catchweight (173 lbs) bout.
|-
| Win
| align=center| 6-0
| Justin Carr
| Submission (reverse triangle choke)
| Xplode Fight Series: Devastation
| 
| align=center| 1
| align=center| 0:35
| Valley Center, California, United States
| 
|-
| Win
| align=center| 5-0
| Tsuyoshi Holder
| Decision (split)
| Xplode Fight Series: Vengeance
| 
| align=center| 3
| align=center| 5:00
| Valley Center, California, United States
| 
|-
| Win
| align=center| 4-0
| Mark McCaw
| TKO (punches)
| NFC: Native Fighting Championship 11
| 
| align=center| 3
| align=center| 1:15
| Campo, California, United States
| 
|-
| Win
| align=center| 3-0
| Mike Lemaire
| Decision (unanimous)
| KOTC: Legends
| 
| align=center| 3
| align=center| 5:00
| Winterhaven, California, United States
| 
|-
| Win
| align=center| 2-0
| Ray Lizama
| Decision (majority)
| KOTC 39: Hitmaster
| 
| align=center| 2
| align=center| 5:00
| San Jacinto, California, United States
| 
|-
| Win
| align=center| 1-0
| Saldana Clemente
| TKO (punches)
| KOTC 27: Aftermath
| 
| align=center| 1
| align=center| 1:25
| San Jacinto, California, United States
|

See also
List of male mixed martial artists

References

External links
 
 
 
 

American male mixed martial artists
Welterweight mixed martial artists
Middleweight mixed martial artists
Heavyweight mixed martial artists
Mixed martial artists utilizing Muay Thai
Mixed martial artists utilizing wrestling
Mixed martial artists utilizing Brazilian jiu-jitsu
Mixed martial artists from Michigan
Living people
American Muay Thai practitioners
American practitioners of Brazilian jiu-jitsu
Year of birth missing (living people)